Mekhliganj subdivision is one of five subdivisions of the Cooch Behar district in the state of West Bengal, India. It has an area of 459.78 km2 . As of 2011, it has a population of 282,750 of which 90.09% are rural and 9.91 are urban.

Administrative units 
Mekhliganj subdivision has 3 police stations, 2 community development blocks, 2 panchayat samitis, 14 gram panchayats, 249 mouzas, 194 inhabited villages, 2 municipality and 1 census town. The municipalities are: Mekhliganj and Haldibari. The census town is: Nagar Changrabandha. The subdivision has its headquarters at Mekhliganj.

Police stations
Police stations in the Mekhliganj subdivision have the following features and jurisdiction:

Blocks 
Community development blocks in the Mekhliganj subdivision are:

Gram panchayats
The subdivision contains 14 gram panchayats under 2 community development blocks:

 Mekhliganj block consists of eight gram panchayats, viz. Bagdogra–Fulkadabri, Jamaldaha, Niztarof, Uchalpukuri, Changrabandha, Kuchlibari, Ranirhat and Bhotbari.
 Haldibari block consists of six gram panchayats, viz. Boxiganj, Dakshin Bara Haldibari, Hemkumari, Uttar Bara Haldibari, Dewanganj and Per–Mekhliganj.

Education
Given in the table below (data in numbers) is a comprehensive picture of the education scenario in Cooch Behar district, with data for the year 2012–13.

Note: Primary schools include junior basic schools; middle schools, high schools and higher secondary schools include madrasahs; technical schools include junior technical schools, junior government polytechnics, industrial technical institutes, industrial training centres, nursing training institutes etc.; technical and professional colleges include engineering colleges, medical colleges, para-medical institutes, management colleges, teachers training and nursing training colleges, law colleges, art colleges, music colleges etc. Special and non-formal education centres include sishu siksha kendras, madhyamik siksha kendras, centres of Rabindra mukta vidyalaya, recognised Sanskrit tols, institutions for the blind and other handicapped persons, Anganwadi centres, reformatory schools etc.

Educational institutions
The following institutions are located in Mekhliganj subdivision:
Mekliganj College was established in 1996 at Mekhliganj.
Netaji Subhas Mahavidyalaya was established in 1985 at Haldibari.

Healthcare
The table below (all data in numbers) presents an overview of the medical facilities available and patients treated in the hospitals, health centres and sub-centres in 2013 in Cooch Behar district, with data for the year 2012–13.:

.* Excluding nursing homes.

Medical facilities
Medical facilities in the Mekhliganj subdivision are as follows:

Hospitals: (Name, location, beds) 
Mekhliganj Subdivisional Hospital, Mekhliganj M, 120 beds

Rural Hospitals: (Name, CD block, location, beds) 
Haldibari Rural Hospital, Haldibari CD block, Haldibari M, 30 beds

Block Primary Health Centres: (Name, CD block, location, beds)
Changrabandha Block Primary Health Centre, Mekhliganj CD block, Changrabandha, 10 beds

Primary Health Centres : (CD block-wise)(CD block, PHC location, beds)
Mekhliganj CD block: Jamaldaha (10)
Haldibari CD block: Anguldekha (PO Bakshiganj) (10 beds), Hudumdanga (PO Dewanganj) (6), Kuchlibari (6)

Legislative segments
As per order of the Delimitation Commission in respect of the delimitation of constituencies in the West Bengal, the municipalities of Mekhliganj and Haldibari and the two blocks of Mekhliganj and Haldibari together will constitute the Mekhliganj assembly constituency of West Bengal. It will be reserved for Scheduled castes (SC) candidates. This constituency will be part of Jalpaiguri (Lok Sabha constituency), which will be reserved for SC candidates.

References

Subdivisions of West Bengal
Subdivisions in Cooch Behar district
Cooch Behar district